The Belfast Guidelines is a project led by Professor Louise Mallinder and Prof Tom Hadden of the Transitional Justice Institute. The Guidelines examine the principles concerning the legality and legitimacy of amnesties in states transitioning from conflict or authoritarian regimes. They were drafted by an expert group that included Prof David Kretzmer and Prof William Schabas. They have been widely translated into Arabic, Chinese, Malay, Portuguese, Russian, Spanish and Thai.

See also
 Ulster University School of Law
 Transitional Justice
 Transitional Justice Institute
 Amnesty law

References

External links
 Belfast Guidelines
 TJI Facebook Page
 TJI Main Page
 TJI Twitter Page

Ulster University
Human rights organisations based in the United Kingdom
International law